Óscar Vega may refer to:
Óscar Vega (boxer) (born 1965), Spanish boxer
Óscar Vega (born 1987), Spanish footballer